Steven Graham Terry  (born 14 June 1962) is an English former professional footballer who played as a defender in the Football League for Watford, Hull City and  Northampton Town. He played in the 1984 FA Cup Final for Watford.

Career
Playing for the junior teams of Cheshunt before becoming an apprentice at Watford, Terry also played for Hull City, Northampton Town and Walton & Hersham. He later played non-league football with Enfield and Billericay Town.

References

External links
On Cloud Seven

1962 births
Living people
English footballers
Walton & Hersham F.C. players
Cheshunt F.C. players
Watford F.C. players
Hull City A.F.C. players
Northampton Town F.C. players
English Football League players
Enfield F.C. players
Billericay Town F.C. players
Association football defenders
FA Cup Final players